The Three Rivers Athletic Conference is an Ohio High School Athletic Association (OHSAA) high school athletic conference that began athletic competition in 2011 and has 10 high schools from Northwest Ohio, seven of which are from the Toledo metropolitan area, and one each from the cities of Findlay, Fremont and Lima. Ken Myers, former director of public safety and public services in Fremont, is the league's inaugural commissioner. The three rivers from which the conference derives its name are the Maumee, Sandusky, and Blanchard.

Members

History 
The Three Rivers Athletic Conference began its inaugural season in the fall of 2011.  The idea for the creation of the league was brought about following Toledo Public Schools' decisions to close Libbey High School and athletic cuts within TPS which were made by the system to offset a reported $39 million budget deficit.  In May 2010, the Toledo Public School board of education voted to cut all junior high (seventh and eighth grade) and freshman sports, as well as the discontinuation of boys tennis, cross country, golf, ice hockey and wrestling.  This caused concern for the non-TPS members, who wanted to have competition in those sports and at those levels without struggling to find games.

Clay High School, who joined the Toledo City League in 2003, were the first school to announce that they would leave following a unanimous vote of 5–0 by the Oregon School District in mid July 2010.  Following Clay's decision, TCL members Central Catholic, Notre Dame, St. Francis de Sales, St. John's Jesuit, St. Ursula and Whitmer all announced that they would leave the City League as well.  Fremont Ross, who was to join the City League in 2011, as well as Findlay and Lima Senior were also announced as members of the new league.

Near the end of July 2010, the new league's members announced that Three Rivers Athletic Conference was chosen to be the name for the conference.  The name represents the Northwest Ohio rivers - the Maumee, the Sandusky and the Blanchard - which are part of the collective geography of the 10 inaugural member schools.  Other names considered for the new league included Toledo Metro Athletic Conference, the Greater Metro Athletic Conference and the Northwest Athletic Conference.  Each member of the TRAC will be asked to submit a logo design for the league and the conference's ten principals will make a decision on which logo will be chosen for the league.

Although he indicated that joining the TRAC was "probably off the table", Marion Harding athletic director Gary Miller mentioned that his school did apply for admission into the TRAC as an alternative to being independent in the future.  Marion Harding remained members of the Greater Buckeye Conference with Findlay, Fremont Ross, and Lima Senior through the 2010-11 school year, and eventually wound up in the Mid-Ohio Athletic Conference in 2014.

On April 9, 2021, invitations were extended to four TRAC schools by the NLL, starting with the 2023-2024 school year:  Findlay, Fremont Ross, Oregon Clay, and Whitmer.  Fremont Ross voted to accept the invitation on April 12, Findlay on April 19, Clay on April 20, and Whitmer on April 21. 

On March 10, 2022, Lima Senior announced that it would be joining the Toledo City League in 2023 on a four-year contract as its seventh member.  Lima Senior wasn't invited to join the NLL with the other public TRAC schools and decided being in a league was preferable to independence.

On March 22, 2022, the five Catholic high schools in the TRAC (Central Catholic, Notre Dame, St. Francis, St. John's Jesuit, and St. Ursula) were introduced as the newest members of the Detroit Catholic High School League, effective for the fall of 2023.  They will bring the CHSL's membership up to 32 schools, which create divisions based on the competitiveness of each school's teams.

Competition format 
The TRAC will play a standard seven-game varsity football schedule in weeks 4-10 of the season, with each of the eight schools that have varsity football playing non-league games in the first three weeks of the football season.

Hockey will be contested outside of the conference umbrella. The hockey teams will retain their membership in the three-tiered Northwest Hockey Conference.

The TRAC will have championship competition for football and all of its other sanctioned sports.

League championships

Boys championships

Girls championships

References 
Official Site of the TRAC

Ohio high school sports conferences